Charleroi can refer to:

 Charleroi, a city in Belgium
 Brussels South Charleroi Airport, an airport in Belgium
 R. Charleroi S.C., a football club in Belgium
 Charleroi, Pennsylvania, a borough in the United States